Breathe Easy is a 2022 Russian romantic drama film directed by Sergei Bodrov. It was theatrically released on May 12, 2022.

Plot 
The film is about a man named Ilya who stutters and decides to enroll in Dr. Cherkasova's course in the hope that she will help him. As a result, he finds new friends and a girlfriend.

Cast

Production 
Sergei Bodrov wanted to make a movie about the fight against stuttering back in the 90s, but several times he postponed the implementation of this idea.
The production of the picture was carried out by the CTB Film Company, headed by the head of the company, Sergei Selyanov.
The project was developed with the support of the Ministry of Culture of the Russian Federation.

References

External links 
 Official website at the CTB Film Company 

2022 films
2020s Russian-language films
2022 romantic drama films
Russian romantic drama films
Films shot in Saint Petersburg
Films directed by Sergei Bodrov